Johannes Ciconia ( – between 10 June and 13 July 1412) was an important Flemish composer and music theorist of trecento music during the late Medieval era.  He was born in Liège, but worked most of his adult life in Italy, particularly in the service of the papal chapels in Rome and later and most importantly at Padua Cathedral.

Life
He was the son of a priest (also named Johannes Ciconia) and a woman of high social standing. Since at least three other men around Liège had that name as well, this has created biographical confusion, first solved by David Fallows in 1975. A Johannes Ciconia, probably the composer's father, worked in Avignon in 1350 as a clerk for the wife of Pope Clement VI's nephew.

Papal records suggest that Ciconia was in the service of Pope Boniface IX in Rome in 1391. His whereabouts between the early 1390s and 1401 are unknown. From 1401 until his death in 1412, he was connected to the cathedral of Padua in some capacity. However, it is unclear whether Ciconia arrived in Padua even earlier than 1401. His lament Con lagrime bagnadome is described in one source as written for the death of Francesco of Carrara - if this refers to Francesco il Nuovo ("the New"), it would date from after 1406; if, however, it was written for the death of Francesco il Vecchio ("the Old"), as scholars have assumed, this would place him in Padua as early as 1393. There is also the possibility of an intermediate stay in Pavia (as suggested by the scholars John Nádas and Agostino Ziino), on the grounds that this is where he would have connected with the House of Visconti and acquired knowledge of the ars subtilior style and the compositions of Philippus de Caserta quoted in his Sus un fontayne ("Under a fountain") (see below).

Music
Ciconia's music is an eclectic blend of styles. Pieces typical of northern Italy, such as his madrigal Una panthera, appear with pieces steeped in the French ars nova. The more complex ars subtilior style surfaces in Sus un fontayne. While it remains late medieval in style, his writing increasingly points toward the melodic patterning of the Renaissance, for instance in his setting of O rosa bella. He wrote music both secular (French virelais, Italian ballate and madrigals) and sacred (motets and Mass movements, some of them isorhythmic) in form. He is also the author of two treatises on music, Nova Musica and De Proportionibus (which expands on some ideas in Nova Musica). His theoretical ideas stem from the more conservative Marchettian tradition in contrast to those of his Paduan contemporary Prosdocimus de Beldemandis.

Although contrafacts and later manuscript sources of his compositions suggest that he was well known in Florence, his music is scarcely represented in major Florentine sources of the period; for instance, the Squarcialupi Codex contains nothing by Ciconia. But on the other hand, many of his motets and Mass movements are included in the manuscript known as "Bologna MS Museo Internazionale e Biblioteca della Musica Q15".

Recordings
 Johannes Ciconia: Oeuvre intégrale, Huelgas Ensemble (Pavane, 1982).
 Johannes Ciconia: Opera omnia, La Morra and Diabolus in Musica (ensemble) (Ricercar, 2011).

References

Further reading
 Giuliano Di Bacco, John Nádas, Margaret Bent and David Fallows, "Ciconia, Johannes." S.v. in The New Grove Dictionary of Music and Musicians, 2nd Edition (London: Macmillan, 2001).
 Suzanne Clercx (later Clercx-Lejeune), Johannes Ciconia: Un musicien liégeois et son temps (Vers 1335-1411), Vol. 1. La vie et l'œuvre, Vol. 2. Transcriptions et notes critiques (Bruxelles: Palais des Académies, 1960).
 Albert Dunning, "Low Countries", Grove Music Online, accessed 28 October 2010 (subscription required).
 Richard H. Hoppin, Medieval Music (New York: W.W. Norton & Co., 1978).
 Philippe Vendrix, ed., Johannes Ciconia: musicien de la transition (Turnhout, Belgium: Brepols, 2003).

External links
 
 
 Johannes Ciconia Discography at A Viola da Gamba Weblog.
 Johannes Ciconia Discography at Musiciens Wallons.

1370 births
1412 deaths
Ars subtilior composers
Belgian male classical composers
Italian music theorists
Trecento composers
Walloon people
Medieval male composers
Medieval music theorists